Rush Point is an unincorporated community in Nessel Township, Chisago County, Minnesota, United States.

Chisago County Roads 4 and 7 are two of the main routes in the community.  Nearby places include Rush City, Stanchfield, Braham, Grandy, Stark, Harris, and Cambridge.

ZIP codes 55080 (Stanchfield), 55069 (Rush City), and 55006 (Braham) all intersect near Rush Point.

References

Unincorporated communities in Minnesota
Unincorporated communities in Chisago County, Minnesota